Centrosolenia is a genus of flowering plants belonging to the family Gesneriaceae.

Its native range is Northern South America to Northern Brazil.

Species:

Centrosolenia bryogeton 
Centrosolenia chimantensis 
Centrosolenia coccinea 
Centrosolenia crenata 
Centrosolenia densa 
Centrosolenia hirsuta 
Centrosolenia orinocensis 
Centrosolenia paujiensis 
Centrosolenia porphyrotricha 
Centrosolenia pusilla 
Centrosolenia rosea 
Centrosolenia rubra 
Centrosolenia vestita

References

Gesnerioideae
Gesneriaceae genera